The 1979 NCAA Division I-AA football season, part of college football in the United States organized by the National Collegiate Athletic Association at the Division I-AA level, began in August 1979, and concluded with the 1979 NCAA Division I-AA Football Championship Game on December 15, 1979, at Orlando Stadium in Orlando, Florida. The Eastern Kentucky Colonels won their first I-AA championship, defeating the Lehigh Engineers by a final score of 30−7.

Conference changes and new programs

Conference standings

Conference champions

Postseason

NCAA Division I-AA playoff bracket
The bracket consisted of three regional selections (West, East, and South) plus Eastern Kentucky as an at-large selection.

* Next to name denotes host institution

* Next to score denotes overtimes

See also
1979 NCAA Division I-A football season
1979 NCAA Division II football season
1979 NCAA Division III football season
1979 NAIA Division I football season
1979 NAIA Division II football season

References